Monte Cristo (1929), also known as Le Comte de Monte-Cristo in France and The Count of Monte-Cristo in the US, is a French silent film directed by Henri Fescourt, and is a film adaptation of the 1844 novel The Count of Monte Cristo by Alexandre Dumas, père.

Long forgotten, the film underwent a restoration effort from 1999 to 2006 under the direction of Lenny Borger, with funding by the Arte channel. A nearly complete reconstruction was assembled from four prints in Eastern European archives. The restored film received its North American premiere at the San Francisco International Film Festival on 3 May 2015.

Fescourt used four cameramen to best capture movement, and often filmed in real locations mentioned in the novel, including the prison of Chateau d'If. The film has been critically praised as "an epic triumph of the silent cinema at its height," distinguished by its combination of commercial cinema dramatics and techniques used by French impressionist filmmakers (including micro-flashbacks, extreme close-ups, zip-pans, energetic moving camera, and extreme shifts in focus). The BFI's Silent Film Guide writes that "the elegance and orchestration of the film-making is extraordinary" and praises the lavish scenes at the Paris Opera and Monte Cristo's mansion as "staggeringly opulent."

See also
1929 in film

References

External links

Monte Cristo (1929) at SilentEra
The Forgotten: "Monte Cristo" (1929) at Mubi: Notebook

1929 films
Films based on The Count of Monte Cristo
French silent feature films
French historical adventure films
1920s historical adventure films
French black-and-white films
Silent historical adventure films
1920s French films
1920s French-language films